The 2007 Kentucky Wildcats football team represented the University of Kentucky in the college football season of 2007–2008. The team's head football coach was Rich Brooks, in his 5th year as Kentucky's head coach. The Wildcats played their home games at Commonwealth Stadium in Lexington, Kentucky. The team is remembered by many college football fans for its prolific offense, led by seniors Rafael Little, Keenan Burton, Stevie Johnson, and André Woodson.

Schedule

Game summaries

Eastern Kentucky

André Woodson threw for a 51-yard touchdown on Kentucky's first snap of the season, as the Wildcats rout Eastern Kentucky, 50–10. Kentucky scored five touchdowns on their first eight drives, and punted only once, in the fourth quarter. Rafael Little had 135 yards on the ground for Kentucky.

Kent State

Kentucky had 266 yards and six touchdowns on the ground, but Kentucky's porous run defense was gashed for 324 yards on the ground by the Golden Flashes. Woodson looked out of sync until he hit Keenan Burton for a fifty-one yard score in the third quarter. Tony Dixon, André Woodson, Alfonso Smith, and Derrick Locke all had one rushing touchdown for Kentucky, where John Conner had two.

Kent State struck first on a fake field goal, ran six yards for a touchdown by holder Leneric Muldrow. Conner ran in from five yards out, and Woodson fired back with a 33-yard touchdown pass to give the Wildcats a 14-7 lead. The Golden Flashes Eugene Jarvis scored on a ten-yard run up the middle, but John Conner and Tony Dixon ran in, and André Woodson hit Keenan Burton to the right for 51 yards and a touchdown. Kent State, down 14–35 answered with a Julian Edelman pass to Eugene Jarvis for a 22-yard touchdown, but Woodson, Alfonso Smith, and Derrick Locke ran in for touchdowns of 1, 12, and 67 yards respectively.

Louisville

With 28 seconds left, André Woodson threw a 57-yard touchdown pass to Stevie Johnson to knock off #9 Louisville, the first time the Wildcats had beaten a top ten team in thirty years. Woodson finished 30 of 44 for 275 yds and four touchdowns. Woodson also did not throw an interception, and he ended the game with 257 passes without an interception. This became a new SEC record, breaking David Greene's record and falling fourteen attempts short of Trent Dilfer's all-time mark.

Placekicker Lones Seiber started the scoring for the Wildcats with a 36-yard field goal, and Woodson followed later with a five-yard touchdown strike, with another Seiber kick, to make the lead 13–0 in favor of Kentucky. Louisville Senior Quarterback Brian Brohm found Anthony Allen for an eight-yard touchdown. Rafael Little ran up the middle for a ten-yard score in the second quarter, but Seiber missed the PAT, resulting in a 19–7 Kentucky lead. Brian Brohm passed to Harry Douglas for a TD, and Louisville added a ten-yard touchdown run from Anthony Allen to pull in front 21–19.

Opening the second-half scoring, Woodson threw a seven-yard touchdown pass but on the ensuing kickoff lightning struck for the Cardinals in the form of Trent Guy's 100 yard kickoff return. Once again, Kentucky answered with a Woodson pass to Jacob Tamme. Brohm then began an 84-yard drive that ended in Anthony Allen's 2-yard touchdown run and a Cardinal lead. Brohm would've been sacked for a loss on the drive, but a fifteen-yard personal foul penalty on cornerback Trevard Lindley gave the Cardinals room to operate as well as a fresh set of downs. Despite Brohm's heroics, they were topped by Woodson's 57 yard touchdown hookup to wideout Steve Johnson to beat the Cardinals for the first time in Kentucky's last five tries. This was the first time Woodson had gotten a win against Brohm, Woodson's rival dating back to their high schools, separated by only 45 miles.

Arkansas

Florida Atlantic
Andre Woodson threw his first interception in his previous 325 attempts, snapping his NCAA record for consecutive passes thrown without an INT.

South Carolina

LSU

Florida

Mississippi State

Vanderbilt

Georgia

Tennessee

Florida State

Statistics
Quarterback Andre Woodson set a new NCAA record with 325 consecutive pass attempts without an interception. His 40 touchdown passes set a new SEC record, and his 81 career touchdown passes set a new school record.

Team

Weekly rankings

Depth chart

Starters

 bold - Denotes returning starter
 ↑ - Denotes number of games started by the player at the listed position during the 2008 season.

Roster

References

Kentucky
Kentucky Wildcats football seasons
Music City Bowl champion seasons
Kentucky Wildcats football